Island Park is a village located in the Town of Hempstead in Nassau County, New York, United States. The population was 4,655 at the 2010 census.

History 
Island Park was developed by the Island Park-Long Beach Company as a resort community in the 1920s, after previous development plans were cancelled due to World War I.

Island Park incorporated itself as a village in 1926. Its first mayor was Charles N. Talbot, who served in that capacity for 12 years.

In the 1950s, there was a proposal in which Island Park would have annexed the adjacent hamlet of Harbor Isle. The proposal was ultimately was defeated, and to this day, Harbor Isle remains an unincorporated hamlet governed by the Town of Hempstead.

Geography

The Village of Island Park is part of the Outer Barrier of Long Island and is bordered on the west by a man-made canal running parallel to Suffolk Road. Its northern, eastern, and southern borders are delineated by the rails of the Long Beach Branch of the Long Island Rail Road.

Demographics 

As of the census of 2010, there were 2,032 people, 1,603 households, and 1,872 families residing in the village. The population density was 8,865.7 people per square mile (4,937.9/km2). There were 1,715 housing units. The median home value was $721,600. The racial makeup of the village was 94.6% White, 1.9% African American, 0.2% Native American, 0.5% Asian, 0.2% from other races. 1.8% were from two or more races. 2.5% of the population were Hispanic or Latino of any race. The primary ethnicities are Italian and Irish.

There were 1,685 households, out of which 33.0% had children under the age of 18 living with them, 51.3% were married couples living together, 13.9% had a female householder with no husband present, and 28.8% were non-families. 23.3% of all households were made up of individuals, and 9.6% had someone living alone who was 65 years of age or older. The average household size was 2.69 and the average family size was 3.17.

In the village, the population was spread out, with 22.1% aged 19 and under, 6.1% from 20 to 24, 33.6% from 25 to 44, 27.8% from 45 to 64, and 13.5% who were 65 years of age or older. The median age was 40.8 years. Female population was 51.1% and male population was 49.9%.

The median income for a household in the village was $162,500, and the median income for a family was $192,765. Males had a median income of $157,018 versus $177,764 for the female population per capita income. The per capita for the village was $28,149. 8.6% of the population and 0.1% of families were below the poverty line. 0.01% of those people were under the age of 18 and 11.1% were 65 and older.

Government

The community of Island Park is run by the Incorporated Village of Island Park which performs the majority of municipal services for residents, businesses and other community organizations. The Village is controlled by a 5 member village board which consists of the Mayor, Deputy Mayor, and three trustees, all of whom serve four year terms. The board votes on all resolutions in the village and are chiefly responsible for all municipal operations. The Village Clerk runs the day to day operations of the Village and acts as a supervisor for all Village staff. 

As of May 2022, the Mayor of Island Park is Michael G. McGinty, the Deputy Mayor is Matthew Graci, and the Village Trustees are Irene P. Naudus, Robert Tice, and Barbara A. Volpe-Ried.

Education
Island Park is located entirely within the boundaries of the Island Park Union Free School District, which provides education to all children in the Village of Island Park who attend public schools through grade 8. Students in grades K-4 attend the Francis X. Hegarty Elementary School, and those in grades 5-8 attend Lincoln Orens Middle School. Children in grades 9–12 used to have the choice of attending either Long Beach High School or West Hempstead High School. Now, they just attend Long Beach

Transportation 
The Island Park station on the Long Island Rail Road's Long Beach Branch provides commuters with a direct link to New York City.

Notable people
Anthony Bitetto (born 1990), professional hockey player for the New York Rangers.
Al D'Amato (born 1937), United States Senator from New York from 1981 to 1999.
Anthony D'Esposito (born 1982), Congressman, United States House of Representatives (2023-

 Tim Dillon (born 1985), actor, comedian, and host of The Tim Dillon Show podcast.
John F. Good (1936-2016), FBI agent who created the Abscam sting operation in the late 1970s and early 1980s.
Raymond Kelly (born 1941), former New York City Police Commissioner.
Vinny Palermo, former de facto head of the New Jersey DeCalvacante mafia family and basis for character Tony Soprano from the HBO series The Sopranos. Lived in Island Park with his family in the 1990s.

References

External links
Village of Island Park website

Villages in Nassau County, New York
Populated coastal places in New York (state)